Katarze is a song from the album Katarze of the Czech pop music group Slza. The song was released on November 13, 2015  on Spotify, Apple Music, iTunes, Deezer, and Google Play on October 25, 2015 at 18:00, a video clip for a song on YouTube was recorded.

Video clip was directed by Vít Karas. It turned to the Vltava and the flat.

References 

Slza songs
Universal Music Group singles
2015 singles
2015 songs
Songs written by Xindl X